The 2016 New Zealand Warriors season was the 22nd season in the club's history. Coached by Andrew McFadden and captained by Ryan Hoffman, the Warriors competed in the National Rugby League's 2016 Telstra Premiership and the 2016 NRL Auckland Nines tournament.

Milestones

Simon Mannering and Roger Tuivasa-Sheck were named to play for the World All Stars in the 2016 All Stars match. They both later withdrew and were replaced by Ryan Hoffman and Konrad Hurrell. Hurrell scored a try as the World All-Stars won 12-8.
17 February: Simon Mannering announced he had decided to step down as club captain. He was replaced by Ryan Hoffman.
19 February: The Warriors announced that they had signed an agreement with Regional Facilities Auckland extending their contract to use Mount Smart Stadium until the end of 2028.
5 March - round 1: Roger Tuivasa-Sheck, Blake Ayshford, Jeff Robson, Issac Luke, Nathaniel Roache and James Gavet all made their debuts for the club. It was also Roache's NRL debut.
20 March - round 3: Jazz Tevaga made his NRL debut.
3 April - round 5: Jacob Lillyman played in his 150th match for the Warriors.
16 April - round 7: Ligi Sao made his Warriors debut.
1 May - round 9: Toafofoa Sipley made his NRL debut and Shaun Lane played his first match for the Warriors.
6 May: Shaun Johnson played for the New Zealand national rugby league team in the 2016 Anzac Test.
7 May: Erin Clark played for Samoa while David Fusitua and Solomone Kata played for Tonga. Ata Hingano, Nathaniel Roache, Marata Niukore and Isaiah Papalii represented the Junior Kiwis.
June–July: Jacob Lillyman served as 18th man for Queensland in game one of the 2016 State of Origin series and came from the bench in game two and three.
11 June - round 14: Issac Luke played in his 200th NRL match.
2 July - round 17: Simon Mannering played in his 250th NRL match, all for the Warriors. Bunty Afoa made his NRL debut. It was also the Warriors 250th first grade match at Mount Smart Stadium.
20 August - round 24: Ata Hingano made his first grade debut.
28 August - round 25: Tuimoala Lolohea scored the 2,000th try in the club's history.
8 October: Ken Maumalo, Mason Lino, Erin Clark, Sam Lisone, Bunty Afoa and James Gavet represented Samoa in a test match against Fiji.
October–November: David Fusitu'a, Solomone Kata, Thomas Leuluai, Shaun Johnson, Issac Luke and Simon Mannering were named in the New Zealand squad for the 2016 Rugby League Four Nations.

Jersey and sponsors

Fixtures

Pre-season training
Pre-season training began on 2 November 2015, with the exception of players involved in the New Zealand Kiwis tour of Great Britain.

Auckland Nines
The Warriors competed in the 2016 NRL Auckland Nines, losing to the Parramatta Eels 4-22 in the final. The squad for the tournament was Roger Tuivasa-Sheck, Ryan Hoffman, Jacob Lillyman, Nathaniel Roache, Solomone Kata, Tuimoala Lolohea, Shaun Johnson (c), Charlie Gubb, Henare Wells, Konrad Hurrell, Ben Matulino, Ken Maumalo, Jonathan Wright, Jeff Robson, Sam Lisone, Blake Ayshford, Albert Vete and Ata Hingano. David Fusitu'a was originally named but withdrew due to injury and was replaced by Nathaniel Roache.

Shaun Johnson and Tuimoala Lolohea were named in the team of the tournament.

Pre-season matches

Regular season

Home matches were played at Mount Smart Stadium in Auckland with the exception of one home game which was played at Yarrow Stadium in New Plymouth. Two away games were also played in New Zealand.

Ladder

Squad

Staff
Chief Executive Officer: Jim Doyle
Media and Communications Manager: Richard Becht
Football Operations Manager: Dan Floyd
Team Manager: Laurie Hale
Head of Medical Services: John Mayhew
Recuritment and Development Manager: Tony Iro
Welfare and Education Manager: Jerry Seuseu
Academy and Pathways Manager: Duane Mann

Coaching staff
NRL head coach: Andrew McFadden
NRL assistant coach: Justin Morgan
NRL assistant coach: Andrew Webster
NSW Cup head coach: Stacey Jones
NSW Cup assistant coach: Ricky Henry
NYC head coach: Kelvin Wright
NYC assistant coach: Boycie Nelson

Transfers

Gains

Losses

Other teams
As in 2015, the Warriors entered a team into the Intrust Super Premiership NSW and the Junior Warriors competed in the Holden Cup.

Intrust Super Premiership NSW squad

The Warriors finished 5th in the regular season, before defeating the Penrith Panthers 21-14 in an elimination final. They then lost 18-22 to the Newtown Jets in a semi-final.

John Palavi and Upu Poching played in their 50th NSW Cup matches for the Warriors, becoming the first players to reach this milestone for the club.

Holden Cup squad

The Junior Warriors finished the season in 14th position, with 8 wins, a draw, and 15 losses.

Club awards
Simon Mannering was named the club's player of the year for a record fifth time. He was also named the clubman of the year. Shaun Johnson won the people's choice award while Nathaniel Roache was the NRL rookie of the year.

Ryan Hoffman was named in the NRL-RLPA academic team of the year, as he was completing a Bachelor of Business. Ben Henry also won a Pasifika leadership and excellence award, which included travel to the University of California, Los Angeles (UCLA) to attend lectures.

Charnze Nicoll-Klokstad was the Intrust Super Premiership NSW player of the year, while James Bell was the teams man of the year.

Chris Sio was the Junior Warriors player of the year and Chanel Harris-Tavita was the Junior Warriors rookie of the year.

Journalist Allen McLaughlin was also awarded a legacy award, after covering all but one of the club's 254 games at the venue since 1995.

References

External links
Warriors 2016 season rugby league project

New Zealand Warriors seasons
New Zealand Warriors season
Warriors season